Henrietta Maria was a 42-gun second rank ship of the line of the English navy, launched at Deptford Dockyard in 1633.

In 1650, she was renamed Paragon whilst serving in the navy of the Commonwealth of England. Paragon was lost in 1655.

Notes

References

Lavery, Brian (2003) The Ship of the Line - Volume 1: The development of the battlefleet 1650-1850. Conway Maritime Press. .

Ships of the English navy
Ships built in Deptford
1630s ships